Lemyra dejongi is a moth of the family Erebidae. It was described by Thomas in 1990. It is found on Java.

References

 

dejongi
Moths described in 1990